Cha Hyunjung (born November 5, 1993) also known as Vivian Cha is a South Korean fashion model and television personality.  In August 2015, Cha made her debut in The 18th Magazine CéCi Model Contest.

Career
Cha's modeling career began when she was twenty one years old after she was chosen as No.1 of the 18th Model Contest by Magazine CéCi. She started her first modeling career with Magazine CéCI, SURE, Cosmopolitan, and LEON. she has become the face of Barrel in 2016 with her cousin Girls' Generation Kwon Yuri. She was also a model for commercial film of BMW MINI Korea . She has appeared on the talk show  Get it Beauty, and the reality show Attraction TV on Channel Onstyle.

References

External links
 

1993 births
Living people
South Korean female models
Models from Seoul